Melvich (from Norse Mel Vik – "sand dune bay" – rendered into ) is a village in the county of Sutherland on the north coast of Scotland. It is situated on the A836 road, near the mouth of the River Halladale. It has a successful Gaelic choir.
The A897 road which runs from Helmsdale, through the Strath of Kildonan and past Kinbrace, terminates at Melvich.

References

External links
 Ordnance Survey Grid reference for Melvich
https://web.archive.org/web/20070207043347/http://www.melvichgaelicchoir.org.uk/ The Melvich Gaelic Choir

Populated places in Sutherland
Melvich